Jeremy G. Manning  (born 11 September 1985 in Blenheim, New Zealand) is a New Zealand rugby union footballer who plays for Abu Dhabi Harlequins. He qualified to play for Ireland during the 2008–09 season and has represented Ireland Students.

Munster
Manning planned to sign with North Harbour in the Air New Zealand Cup for the 2008–09 season, but instead secured a new deal with Munster. Munster confirmed that he would leave the club and join Newcastle Falcons on 19 May 2010. While at Munster, he won the 2005–06 Heineken Cup. He also featured in the Munster 'A' side that reached the British and Irish Cup Final in May 2010, before signing for Newcastle Falcons that summer.

Newcastle
Just a few months after joining the club, Manning signed a two-year contract extension with Newcastle in December 2010.

Abu Dhabi Harlequins
His contract was not renewed after 2012 and Manning moved to Abu Dhabi, United Arab Emirates, where he signed with the Abu Dhabi Harlequins and issued the following statement:

"I'm looking forward to starting a new chapter in my life and being part of a great rugby club like Abu Dhabi Harlequins is an amazing bonus"

Honours and awards
After the 2016 Summer Olympics, Manning was awarded the Officer of the Order of Fiji.

References

External links
Munster profile
Newcastle Falcons profile
espnscrum.com profile
ercrugby.com profile

1985 births
Living people
Irish rugby union players
New Zealand rugby union players
Munster Rugby players
Cork Constitution players
Newcastle Falcons players
New Zealand people of Irish descent
Rugby union fly-halves
Rugby union players from Blenheim, New Zealand